Meinhold is a surname. Notable people with the name include:

Bridgette Meinhold, American artist and author
Carl Meinhold (born 1926), American basketball player
Keith Meinhold (born c. 1963), American military personnel
Ivo Meinhold-Heerlein (born 1969), German gynaecologist, obstetrician and professor
Wilhelm Meinhold (1797–1851), German priest and author